Screencheat is a first-person shooter video game developed by Samurai Punk and published by Surprise Attack. The game was released for Microsoft Windows, OS X, and Linux in October 2014 and was released for PlayStation 4 and Xbox One in March 2016. The game was later ported to Nintendo Switch, with enhanced graphics and updated interface, under the name Screencheat: Unplugged, in November 2018.

Gameplay
Screencheat is a multiplayer first-person shooter video game, but in functionality it is a second-person shooter, because every player's character model is invisible. Since the viewpoints of all players are shown on the screen, players are required to look at others' screens to deduce their opponents' location, hence the name of the game. The maps are brightly colored in order to make it easier to figure out where a player is.

Screencheat includes several different gamemodes. Some, including My First Deathmatch, Hillcamper (similar to King of the Hill, but with the hill moved to another place after every few seconds), and Capture the Fun (where players fight for possession of a piñata), are multiplayer FPS standards. The game also has a handful of unique gamemodes, such as One Shot, where each player is limited to one shot and cannot reload until a certain amount of time, and Murder Mystery, in which players have to kill a specific opponent with a particular weapon.

Development and release
Screencheat was developed by Australia-based studio Samurai Punk and published by Surprise Attack. The games inception came from the 2014 Global Game Jam, where it received several awards and honourable mentions. The game was released for Microsoft Windows, OS X, and Linux on 21 October 2014. Prior to release, a free public beta period ran from 4 August 2014 to 3 September 2014. It was released for PlayStation 4 and Xbox One on 1 March 2016. On 29 November 2018, Samurai Punk released Screencheat: Unplugged, optimized for Nintendo Switch with remastered graphics and a new weapon-unlocking system.

Reception

Screencheat received an average reception from critics upon release. Critics praised the game for building an enjoyable experience around a single novel idea, but they also criticised the game's lack of depth, and limited replayability.

References

External links
 

2014 video games
First-person shooters
Game jam video games
Linux games
MacOS games
Nintendo Switch games
PlayStation 4 games
Video games developed in Australia
Windows games
Xbox One games
Fellow Traveller games